W. H. 'Bud' Barron Airport  is a county-owned public-use airport in Laurens County, Georgia, United States. It is located three nautical miles (6 km) northwest of the central business district of Dublin, Georgia.

Facilities and aircraft 
It has two asphalt paved runways: 2/20 is 6,002 by 150 feet (1,829 x 46 m) and 14/32 is 5,004 by 100 feet (1,525 x 30 m).

For the 12-month period ending March 17, 2009, the airport had 24,950 aircraft operations, an average of 68 per day: 99% general aviation and 1% military. At that time there were 32 aircraft based at this airport: 75% single-engine, 22% multi-engine and 3% jet.

References

External links 
 W. H. 'Bud' Barron Airport (DBN) at Georgia DOT Airport Directory
 Dublin Air Service, the airport's fixed-base operator (FBO)
 

Airports in Georgia (U.S. state)
Buildings and structures in Laurens County, Georgia
Transportation in Laurens County, Georgia